Southern Cross Media Group (formerly Macquarie Media Group) is one of Australia's major media companies, as the parent company of Southern Cross Austereo. Its headquarters are in South Melbourne.

History

On 3 July 2007 Southern Cross Broadcasting recommended Macquarie Media Group's offer of A$1.35 billion, for a takeover of the corporation. Under the deal, Macquarie Media Group would then onsell the metropolitan radio stations to Fairfax Media. On 5 November 2007, the company officially acquired Southern Cross Broadcasting's assets. On 17 December 2009 shareholders approved a restructuring plan. The company was then renamed from Macquarie Media Group to its current name on 17 December 2009.

In March 2016, Macquarie Group sold a 15.7% stake in Southern Cross Media worth $130 million, and of that 9.9% was purchased by Nine Entertainment, the owner of the Nine Network. Nine sold this stake in the business six months later.

Assets
American Consolidated Media (10% non-voting stake) 
Southern Cross Austereo
Southern Cross 10
CTC - Australian Capital Territory/Southern NSW (Canberra, Wollongong, Wagga Wagga, South Coast)
GLV/BCV - Victoria (Bendigo, Ballarat, Gippsland, Albury-Wodonga)
TNQ - Queensland (Toowoomba, Mackay, Rockhampton, Townsville, Cairns)
SGS/SCN - South Australia (Spencer Gulf region of South Australia and Broken Hill, New South Wales)
Southern Cross Seven
TNT - Tasmania (Hobart and Launceston)
TND - Northern Territory (Darwin)
GTS/BKN - South Australia (Spencer Gulf region of South Australia and Broken Hill, New South Wales)
QQQ - Central Australia (Remote Eastern and Central Australia)
 Southern Cross Nine
GDS/BDN - South Australia (Spencer Gulf region of South Australia and Broken Hill, New South Wales)
 Tasmanian Digital Television (50% share with WIN Corporation)
 Darwin Digital Television (50% share with Nine Entertainment)
 Central Digital Television (50% share with Imparja Television Pty Ltd)

References

External links
 Southern Cross Austereo

 
Television broadcasting companies of Australia
Companies listed on the Australian Securities Exchange
Companies based in Sydney
Mass media companies of Australia
Mass media companies established in 2007
Australian companies established in 2007